Aleah Finnegan (born January 4, 2003) is a Filipino-American artistic gymnast. She was a member of the United States' women's national gymnastics team from 2019–21 and was part of the team that won gold at the 2019 Pan American Games.  She is currently representing the Philippines in international competition.  She is the younger sister of 2012 Olympic alternate Sarah Finnegan.

Early life
Finnegan was born in St. Louis, Missouri to Don and Linabelle Finnegan. She has three sisters, Sarah, Hannah, and Jennah, who are all also gymnasts.  She began gymnastics in 2005 and moved to Kansas City in 2008 to continue her gymnastics career.

Gymnastics career

Level 10

2016–2017
Finnegan was a Junior Olympic athlete and competed at the 2016 and 2017 J.O Nationals.  In 2016 she placed 29th in the all-around and seventh on balance beam.  In 2017 Finnegan won gold in the all-around for the junior-b division.

Junior elite

2018 
In 2018 Finnegan qualified to junior elite at Brestyan's National Qualifier.  She made her elite debut at the American Classic in July where she finished sixth in the all-around but won bronze on the balance beam. Later that month she competed at the 2018 U.S. Classic where she placed seventh in the all-around.

In August Finnegan competed at her first National Championships where she placed fourteenth in the all-around, fourth on vault, eighteenth on uneven bars and balance beam, and fifteenth on floor exercise.

Senior elite (United States)

2019 
Finnegan turned senior in 2019.  In February she was named to the team to compete at the 2019 International Gymnix in Montreal alongside Alyona Shchennikova, Sloane Blakely, and GAGE teammate Kara Eaker.  While there she won gold in the team final and on vault; she received the fifth highest score in the all-around but did not place due to teammates Eaker and Shchennikova placing higher.

In June, after the conclusion of the American Classic, Finnegan was named as one of the eight athletes being considered for the team to compete at the 2019 Pan American Games along with Sloane Blakely, Kara Eaker, Morgan Hurd, Shilese Jones, Sunisa Lee, Riley McCusker, and Leanne Wong.

At the 2019 GK US Classic, Finnegan placed seventh in the all-around. She also placed second on vault behind Jade Carey, twelfth on uneven bars, tenth on balance beam, and seventh on floor exercise. After the competition she was named to the team to compete at the Pan American Games alongside Eaker, Hurd, McCusker, and Wong.

At the Pan American Games Finnegan competed on vault and floor, with both her scores contributing towards the USA's gold medal winning performance. Individually, Finnegan qualified to the vault final in fourth, behind Ellie Black of Canada, Yesenia Ferrera of Cuba, and Martina Dominici of Argentina. She also posted the fourth highest floor exercise score in the competition, but because teammates McCusker and Eaker scored higher than her, she was unable to compete in the final due to the two-per-country rule. On the first day of event finals it was announced that Finnegan had withdrawn from the vault final due to injury.

At nationals, Finnegan finished thirteenth in the all-around. She also placed fourth on vault, thirteenth on bars, fifteenth on beam, and sixth on floor. She was not named to the national team, but it was announced that she would receive an invite to the Worlds selection camp due to her participation on the Pan American team. Finnegan competed at the U.S. World Championship trials on only balance beam, receiving a score of 13.200, finishing eleventh on the event. She was not named to the World Championship team after the trials.

2020–21 
In November 2020 Finnegan signed her National Letter of Intent with Louisiana State University.

In May 2021 Finnegan competed at the GK U.S. Classic, finishing fifth in the all-around behind Simone Biles, Jordan Chiles, Kayla DiCello, and Grace McCallum.  Additionally she placed seventh on both the balance beam and floor exercise.  The following month Finnegan competed at the National Championships.  She finished 23rd in the all-around after falling during three of the four apparatuses on the first night of competition.  As a result she was not selected to compete at the upcoming Olympic Trials.  Finnegan announced her retirement from elite gymnastics on June 11, intending to continue competing at the NCAA level with the LSU Tigers.

US NCAA & senior elite (Philippines)

2022 
Competing for the LSU Tigers, Finnegan made her collegiate debut on January 28 in a meet against Georgia.  She only competed on the balance beam where she scored a 9.875.

In March it was revealed that Finnegan had decided to represent the Philippines in international competitions and at would make her debut at the postponed 2021 Southeast Asian Games in May 2022.  While there she led the Filipino team to first place in the team competition and individually she placed second in the all-around behind Rifda Irfanaluthfi of Indonesia.  Finnegan qualified to three event finals: vault, uneven bars, and balance beam.  She won gold on vault and silver on balance beam but placed fifth on the uneven bars.

2023 
On February 3, in a meet against Georgia, Finnegan earned her first career perfect 10 for the LSU Tigers on the floor exercise. The following week, she earned her second perfect 10 on vault against Auburn, winning the all-around ahead of Sunisa Lee with a score of 39.8.
On February 17, Finnegan scored a perfect 10 for the third week in a row, this time on the balance beam, helping LSU upset the No. 2 Florida Gators.

Competitive history

Career perfect 10.0

References

External links
 
 Aleah Finnegan at the 2019 Pan American Games

2003 births
Living people
American female artistic gymnasts
Filipino female artistic gymnasts
American sportspeople of Filipino descent
Sportspeople from Missouri
U.S. women's national team gymnasts
Gymnasts at the 2019 Pan American Games
Pan American Games medalists in gymnastics
Pan American Games gold medalists for the United States
Medalists at the 2019 Pan American Games
LSU Tigers women's gymnasts
21st-century American women
Competitors at the 2021 Southeast Asian Games
Citizens of the Philippines through descent
Southeast Asian Games gold medalists for the Philippines
Southeast Asian Games medalists in gymnastics
Southeast Asian Games silver medalists for the Philippines
NCAA gymnasts who have scored a perfect 10